The Linguistic Atlas of the Iberian Peninsula (ALPI) is a project aimed at creating a linguistic atlas of the Iberian Romance languages conceived of by Ramón Menéndez Pidal, directed by his student, Tomás Navarro Tomás, and notable in part for its long and troubled history which included being interrupted by the Spanish Civil War.
Three different teams of interviewers took on the job of collecting the data corresponding to hundreds of different questions in 527 survey points, generally small towns, previously selected in order to cover in the most complete way all the language varieties of the Iberian Peninsula, Roussillon, and the Balearic Islands, with the exception of Basque-speaking areas. Neither the Canary Islands, nor the Azores nor Madeira were included. The greater part of this survey work was realized between 1931 and 1935, and the rest was completed between 1947 and 1954. The material was published on the Internet, beginning in 2002.

Following the traditional methodology of the first linguistic atlases, in each survey point (town or village) two informants were typically chosen, one for the study of phonetics and morphosyntax and the other for the part involving lexicon. These informants were, in general, non-mobile older rural males, or NORMS, although the ALPI did interview a greater number of women informants than other linguistic atlases. In this way, the linguists aimed at studying the most genuine traits of the speech of each location. The informants were then asked to give the typical form in each place for a series of words and phrases, defined in the survey, and their answer was copied by way of phonetic transcription, which reflected the pronunciation. This transcription was done in the RFE Phonetic Alphabet.

The survey-takers were the following:
 Francesc de Borja Moll. 
 Aurelio Macedonio Espinosa.
 Luís F. Lindley Cintra, who was involved in the second phase of the surveying, substituting Armando Nobre de Gusmão in the Portuguese territory.
 Armando Nobre de Gusmão. Initially the Portuguese interviewer was to be Rodrigo de Sá Nogueira, but he abandoned the project short after starting and was replaced by Nobre de Gusmão, who realized the first phase of the interviews, but could not be involved after the Civil War due to sickness.
 Aníbal Otero.
 Lorenzo Rodríguez-Castellano.
 Manuel Sanchis Guarner.

Following from the results of the surveys, the atlas proper was planned to be published, in 10 volumes, but only the first volume came to light.

Mishaps 
The linguistic interviews had to be interrupted due to the Spanish Civil War from 1936-39. Tomás Navarro Tomás had to go into exile, and he took with him the materials from the ALPI.

One of the interviewers, Aníbal Otero, was accused of spying by Portuguese police, apparently for the fact that he used phonetic transcription symbols in his survey notebooks, and was arrested, handed in to Francoist authorities, and condemned to death. Later the penalty was commuted, and he remained in prison until 1941.

In 1962 the first volume out of ten planned was published, but immediately after the work was stopped, and no volumes have been published since. The survey notebooks remained stored in various public and private locations. Starting in 1999, David Heap, professor at the University of Western Ontario, made photocopies of the notebooks and published them online (see External links). In 2016 the online publication of the ALPI from the CSIC began.

Online publication
This task was entrusted to Pilar García Mouton, research professor of the CSIC and specialist in geolinguistics. The team she works with is made up of Inés Fernández-Ordóñez (Autonomous University of Madrid), David Heap (University of Western Ontario), María Pilar Perea (University of Barcelona), João Saramago (Center of Linguistics of the University of Lisbon) and Xulio Sousa Fernández ( of the University of Santiago de Compostela).

The ALPI's web page presents the history of the project, describes its methodology and online publication, and includes easy access to data from the linguistic surveys. It also includes an image gallery, The website also describes in detail the steps of the current publishing process, the criteria followed, and includes a Publications section which gives access to the first volume of the ALPI (CSIC, 1962), to the studies related to the atlas published by its authors and those that have been published by the team that is currently working on its elaboration and digital publishing.

References

Bibliography 

 
 
 
 
 Navarro Tomás, Tomás (1962). Atlas Lingüístico de la península ibérica, I: Fonética. Madrid: CSIC.
 
 Viudas Camarasa, Antonio (2003) "El Atlas Lingüístico de la Península Ibérica y el dialectólogo Alonso Zamora Vicente", Actas del Congreso Internacional "La lengua, la Academia, lo Popular, los Clásicos, los Contemporáneos...", coord. por José Carlos Rovira Soler, Vol. 1,2003, págs.285-300. ( http://www.dialectus.com/colaboraciones/antonioviudascamarasa/ponenciaalicante/alonsozamoravicentedialectologo.html ).

External links 
 Portal con el contenido completo del ALPI y materiales complementarios en el CSIC
 Base de datos con facsímiles del Atlas Lingüístico de la península ibérica 
 Méthodologie comparée de l’ALPI
 Aragón en el ALPI
 Epistolario del ALPI, Cortés-Garcia Perales 2009
 BLOG DEL ALPI, de Vicent Garcia Perales
 Más información, en la versión en catalán
 Notas sobre o Atlas Lingüístico de la península ibérica en Galicia
 Linguistic Atlas of the Iberian Peninsula (ALPI): Progress and Perspectives (Dialectologia. Special Issue III. 2012)

Linguistic atlases
Spanish language
Spanish books
Portuguese language
Catalan language